Arabis kazbegi, the Kazbegian rockcress, is a species of rockcress that is endemic to Georgia, and is known from Mtiuleti, the Devdaraki glacier, Mount Sabertse and Mount Kuro. It grows in subalpine and alpine moraines and scree at elevations of 2,500–3,200 m. It is threatened by natural disasters (especially mud streams), tourism and global climate change.

See also 

 List of Arabis species

References

kazbegi
Vulnerable plants
Endemic flora of Georgia (country)